or  (also called "Gwentian" in English) is a Welsh dialect of South East Wales. The name derives from an old term for the inhabitants of the area, .
One of 's characteristics is the change in the long a vowel to a long e e.g.  rather than the standard  ("the Father, the Son and the Holy Spirit"). The diphthong  is changed in the same way:

This is a diphthong which varies in pronunciation over the  territory and not realised with same phoneme; it is also found in words like , etc. "What is on her?" reflects Welsh .

References

External links 
BBC – De Ddwyrain – Geirfa'r Wenhwyseg
Gwefan Cymru-Catalonia: Y Wenhwyseg

Welsh dialects